This is a list of earthquakes in 1908. Only magnitude 6.0 or greater earthquakes appear on the list. Lower magnitude events are included if they have caused death, injury or damage. Events which occurred in remote areas will be excluded from the list as they wouldn't have generated significant media interest. All dates are listed according to UTC time. One of the early 20th century's worst earthquakes happened this year in Italy. A magnitude 8.2 earthquake was said to have occurred off the Peruvian coast on December 12. This earthquake has been proven to be of false origin since seismological data does not support its existence.

Overall

By death toll 

 Note: At least 10 casualties

By magnitude 

 Note: At least 7.0 magnitude

Notable events

January

February

March

April

May

August

September

October

November

December

References

1908
 
1908